Carter's Little Liver Pills (Carter's Little Pills after 1959) were formulated as a patent medicine by Samuel J. Carter of Erie, Pennsylvania, in 1868.

Ingredients
The active ingredient was changed when the product was renamed in 1959, to be the laxative bisacodyl; the original active ingredients were purported to be  of aloe and  podophyllum resin.

History
Carter's trademark was a black crow. By 1880 the business was incorporated as Carter Products.  The pills were touted to cure headache, constipation, dyspepsia, and biliousness.  In the late 19th century, they were marketed in the UK by American businessman John Morgan Richards.

Carter's Little Liver Pills predated the other available forms of bisacodyl and was a very popular and heavily advertised patent medicine up until the 1960s, spawning a common saying (with variants) in the first half of the 20th century: "He/She has more _ than Carter has Little Liver Pills". In 1951 the Federal Trade Commission required the company to change the name to "Carter's Little Pills", since "liver" in the name was deceptive.

Legacy
The senator Robert Byrd, after winning re-election in 2000, is quoted as saying, "West Virginia has always had four friends, God Almighty, Sears Roebuck, Carter's Liver Pills and Robert C. Byrd."

A Carter's Little Liver Pills ad was featured in Joe Dante's 1968 collage parody film The Movie Orgy.

References

American inventions
Laxatives
Patent medicines
Products introduced in 1868
Companies established in 1880
1880 establishments in Pennsylvania